Corney Swanepoel (born 17 March 1986 in Potchefstroom, South Africa) is a butterfly swimmer from New Zealand. He swam for New Zealand at the 2004 and 2008 Olympics.

At the 2008 Olympics, he swam the 100 fly, where he finished 12th, and swam on New Zealand's 5th-place finishing 4 × 100 medley relay.

He holds the New Zealand Records in the 50m Butterfly (both long course and short course) and 100m Butterfly (both long course and short course).

References
 New Zealand Olympic Committee
 New Zealand Records

External links
 
 
 
 
 

1986 births
Living people
Olympic swimmers of New Zealand
South African emigrants to New Zealand
Swimmers at the 2004 Summer Olympics
Swimmers at the 2008 Summer Olympics
Medalists at the FINA World Swimming Championships (25 m)
People educated at Rangitoto College
New Zealand male butterfly swimmers
21st-century New Zealand people